Robert Gary Havelock (born 4 November 1968, in Eaglescliffe, County Durham, England) is a former speedway rider who was World Champion in 1992.

Career
Havelock's father was speedway rider Brian Havelock. Gary Havelock first competed in grasstrack racing, winning the British Junior Championship, before following his father into speedway. Havelock showed his potential early in his speedway career, winning the Suffolk Open Championship at Mildenhall as a 16-year-old in 1984, only two weeks after qualifying for a licence.

Havelock started his league career with local club Middlesbrough Tigers (the team managed by his father) in 1985, moving from reserve to the main body of the team by May, before moving to the Bradford Dukes in 1987, where he spent the next ten seasons. A season with the Eastbourne Eagles was followed by five seasons with the Poole Pirates until 2003. During this time Havelock also spent the 1986/87 and 1988/89 seasons in Australia based at the North Arm Speedway in Adelaide.

In 1987, Havelock won the European Under-21 Championship. This would be the final year that it would be called the European Championship as it became the World Under-21 Championship from 1988.

The highlight of his career was when he won the World Championship in 1992 at the Olympic Stadium in Wrocław, Poland. Havelock, the first British World Champion since Michael Lee in 1980, finished three points clear of 1990 World Champion Per Jonsson of Sweden, and four in front of Dane Gert Handberg He has also represented Great Britain in the Speedway World Team Cup finals six times, finishing runner-up in 1990 and in the Speedway World Cup four times, finishing runner-up in 2004.

Havelock missed most of the 1996 season after seriously injuring his back whilst representing England in a test match against Australia at Poole in the July. Havelock had ridden in the first two of the Speedway Grand Prix meetings that season.

His 2012 season was ended early by a crash in March in which he was hit by Derek Sneddon's bike, resulting in a broken collarbone, a broken arm, and broken ribs.

As a consequence of the injuries to his arm, Gary Havelock announced his retirement from speedway on 22 February 2013. A week later he was named as the new team manager of Coventry Bees.

Off track
Havelock was banned for the entire 1989 season after he tested positive for cannabis at the  British League Riders' Championship meeting in 1988.

At the 2007 BSPA Annual General Meeting, Great Britain team manager Neil Middleditch announced that he would be "happy to continue" in the position but recommended that Havelock should be his successor once he has retired from racing, stating "he would take to it like a duck to water". Middleditch also mentioned he would be happy for Havelock to act as his assistant.

Havelock appeared in the Sky TV football show Premier League All Stars in 2007, representing eventual winners Middlesbrough F.C.

Havelock is a patron of the charity National Association for Bikers with a Disability.

World final appearances

Individual World Championship
 1992 -  Wrocław, Olympic Stadium - Winner - 14pts
 1993 -  Pocking, Rottalstadion - 6th - 10pts

World Pairs Championship
 1992 -  Lonigo, Pista Speedway (with Kelvin Tatum / Martin Dugard) - 2nd - 23pts (15+2)
 1993 -  Vojens, Vojens Speedway Center (with Joe Screen / Martin Dugard) - 4th - 17pts (0)

World Team Cup
 1988 -  Long Beach, Veterans Memorial Stadium (with Simon Wigg / Simon Cross / Kelvin Tatum / Chris Morton) - 4th - 22pts (8)
 1990 -  Pardubice, Svítkov Stadion (with Kelvin Tatum / Simon Wigg / Jeremy Doncaster / Marvyn Cox) - 2nd - 34pts (5)
 1991 -  Vojens, Vojens Speedway Center (with Marvyn Cox / Martin Dugard / Chris Louis / Paul Thorp) - 4th - 11pts (3)
 1992 -  Kumla, Kumla Speedway (with Mark Loram / Joe Screen / Martin Dugard / Kelvin Tatum) - 3rd - 31pts (7)
 1993 -  Coventry, Brandon Stadium (with Kelvin Tatum / Martin Dugard / Joe Screen / Chris Louis) - 4th - 14pts (4)
 1994 -  Brokstedt, Holsteinring Brokstedt (with Mark Loram / Chris Louis) - 7th - 16pts (3)

World Cup
 2003 -  Vojens, Vojens Speedway Center (with Dean Barker / David Norris / Lee Richardson / Scott Nicholls) - 5th - 44pts (3)
 2004 -  Poole, Poole Stadium (with David Norris / Lee Richardson / Mark Loram / Scott Nicholls) - 2nd - 48pts (9)

Individual Under-21 World Championship
 1987 -  Zielona Góra, SPAR Arena - Winner - 13pts

Speedway Grand Prix results

References

1968 births
Living people
British speedway riders
English motorcycle racers
Individual Speedway World Champions
British Speedway Championship winners
Bradford Dukes riders
Eastbourne Eagles riders
Middlesbrough Bears riders
Peterborough Panthers riders
Poole Pirates riders
Redcar Bears riders
People from Eaglescliffe
Sportspeople from County Durham
Sportspeople from Yorkshire